Søren Hansen (born 1943) is a Danish painter.

Notable collections

Displacement, 1970–1980, oil on canvas; in the collection of the Statens Museum for Kunst, Copenhagen, Denmark

References

1943 births
Living people
20th-century Danish painters
People from Frederiksberg